The 1920–21 Penn Quakers men's basketball team represented the University of Pennsylvania during the 1920–21 NCAA men's basketball season in the United States. The head coach was Edward McNichol, coaching in his first season with the Quakers. The team finished the season with a 21–2 record and was retroactively named the national champion by the Helms Athletic Foundation. This was Penn's second consecutive Helms national championship, the previous year's 21–1 team having later been recognized as the Helms (and Premo-Porretta Power Poll) national champion as well.

Senior Dan McNichol, Edward's younger brother, was named a consensus All-American at the end of the season.

Schedule and results

|-
!colspan=9 style="background:#011F5B; color:#FFFFFF;"| Regular season

Source

References

Penn Quakers men's basketball seasons
NCAA Division I men's basketball tournament championship seasons
Penn
Penn Quakers Men's Basketball Team
Penn Quakers Men's Basketball Team